The Newport music scene, in and around Wales' third city, has been well documented and acclaimed for cultivating bands, singers, and famous music venues. It has been traditionally a rock city since the 1970s, but it has evolved over the years into forms of punk, 1990s alt-rock, and more recently metal and hip-hop.

The city has long attracted a number of musicians to perform or begin their careers in South Wales. Those associated with the city include Joe Strummer of The Clash, Feeder, The Darling Buds, as well as Skindred, and Goldie Lookin Chain.

In 2001 FHM described TJ's as "one of the Top 50 best nights out in the world, ever." Newport is home to the UK's largest retailer of new LPs, Diverse Vinyl, which was established in 1988.

Newport became an alternative rock hotspot in the 1990s, when it was labelled as 'the new Seattle' and credited for bands such as 60 Ft. Dolls, Dub War, Novocaine and Flyscreen.

Manchester-based film maker Nathan Jennings announced in 2017 that a documentary was in the works about the city's musical past and present, titled The Rock of Newport.

History 
Newport has had a noted role in the cultural scene of South Wales and in the western United Kingdom for many decades. Newport Art College, originally based in the Newport Technical Institute buildings and now part of the University of South Wales, attracted budding photographers, musicians and artists to the city from across the United Kingdom.

The college produced many later successes, but also drew a cultural scene to the city associated with its students and young people, such as Joe Strummer of The Clash in the 1970s. Groups linked to Strummer were established including RnB outfit The Vultures, The Gay Dogs, and later many punk groups such as Cowboy Killers.

The 1990s saw the rise of alternative rock and grunge in the United Kingdom. The now established Newport venues such as TJ's started to attract up-and-coming groups and artists.

The likes of Kurt Cobain and later Oasis either attended or performed in the city, and groups such as 60 FT Dolls and Dub War were formed. The reputation was furthered when John Peel began to draw attention to the city's famed nightlife.

Newport currently has one radio station, Newport City Radio, which broadcasts online and previously over FM.

TJ's 

TJ's opened in 1985 on Clarence Place and became famous rock venue on the 'toilet circuit' of UK independent venues. Described by John Peel as "The Legendary TJ's", the venue was voted one of the top 50 'Big Nights Out' in the world by FHM in December 1997.

Started by John Sicolo in 1971 with his wife Vivienne as a restaurant, he then expanded it with the neighbouring property to form the nightclub "El Sieco's", attracting local folk acts among others. It then remodelled in 1985 named TJ's after the first names of John and his late partner Trilby Tucker.

The venue came to UK wide fame in the music video for "Mulder and Scully" by Catatonia, and for being the location where Kurt Cobain proposed to Courtney Love.

The venue claimed hosting bands early in their careers, including Oasis, Manic Street Preachers, Green Day, The Offspring, Lostprophets, Iron Maiden, Sonic Youth, Half Man Half Biscuit, The Stone Roses, Muse, Primal Scream, Descendents, NOFX, Misfits, Mighty Mighty Bosstones, Lagwagon, The Bouncing Souls, The Vandals, The Ataris, and Skunk Anansie.

Sicolo died on 14 March 2010, aged 66, and a tribute concert in his honour was headlined by Goldie Lookin Chain in the city's John Frost Square on 10 July 2010. On 15 September 2011, TJ's was sold at auction for £242,000. 

On 2 February 2013, the building was damaged by a fire, suspected to be arson. The historic building remains empty in 2016.

In 2012, Sicolo's grandson, Ashley Sicolo, opened the 200 Club on Stow Hill, the decor for which included TJ's memorabilia and copies of TJ's gig posters. It went on to close in 2013 due to noise complaints, reopening named El Sieco's on High Street in Newport city centre.

The Smiths 
Newport only received UK chart toppers The Smiths once. In 1986 lead singer Morrissey brought the band to Newport Centre following the release of their widely applauded album The Queen is Dead, only to be mobbed by a throng of hooligans.

Writer Craig Austin described that "the delicate Stretford flower recuperated in the A&E department of the Royal Gwent Hospital (while the) frustrated audience responded to this perceived indignity by commencing the wholesale dismantling of the venue with undisguised rage. The band’s live sound engineer Grant Showbiz took to the stage to apologise on behalf of the band and promptly received a bottle in the face for his troubles.He was also taken to hospital, the police called, and six people eventually arrested. The Smiths were never to play either Newport or Wales again."

Modern era 
2000s Newport saw much upheaval, as the decline of the city's steelworks and docks became further ingrained. While the College and nightlife remained, venues such as TJ's were forced to close, facing mounting debts, noise complaints, and many other issues that plagued similar venues and cities across the UK.

During the period of Cool Britannia, groups like Manic Street Preachers, Feeder, and The Darling Buds formed the Welsh alternative movement popularly known as Cool Cymru.

Most iconic for the city was the surprise success of Goldie Lookin Chain, a hip hop outfit reputed for their humorous views on South Wales life.

Recent years have seen the particular revival of indie venues, with Le Pub moving to a new location on High Street, backed as a community co-operative and driven by the creative mind of owner Sam Dabb. TJ's was resurrected at El Siecco's but this didn’t last long at all and closed after just a few months, The old Tjs  remains derelict on Clarence Place awaiting sale. McCann's Rock 'n' Ale Bar also opened nearby.

The reopening of Grade II listed art deco building The Neon, formerly the Odeon Newport cinema, has offered a much needed venue for the arts, music, and events, in particular urban and hip hop performances which until recently were underserved in the city centre.

The resurge in vinyl sales has also proved a boon for the city, with the growth of Diverse Vinyl as the UK's largest source of new vinyl sales in the UK. Music studios have also opened widely, with up and coming bands facilitated at venues like One Louder Studios in Shaftesbury.

Idles lead singer Joe Talbot was born in Newport in 1984, and his father was a friend of Joe Strummer during his early Art College years before forming the Clash.

The Rock of Newport documentary 

Nathan Jennings, a Newport-born but Manchester based film maker, confirmed in 2017 that a crowdfunding effort would begin to help launch a documentary about the city's music past. Covering topics ranging from the city's role in the production of the Stone Roses single, "Love Spreads", to the gigs hosted by "Bowie, Bad Brains or Blondie to the likes of Oasis, The Offspring and Ozzy", it will make a case for supporting the future of Newport music focussed on an 'actively supported grassroots'.

Details

Music acts 
 Acts who have performed in Newport
 Oasis
 Iron Maiden
 The Stone Roses
 The Smiths
 Paul Weller
 Muse
 Primal Scream
 David Bowie
 Alice Cooper
 Run DMC
 Elvis Costello
 Kasabian
 Marilyn Manson
 Elton John
 Genesis
 Kids in Glass Houses
 Butthole Surfers
 Sonic Youth
 Green Day
 Hüsker Dü
 The Offspring
 Lostprophets
 Half Man Half Biscuit
 Descendents
 NOFX
 Misfits
 Mighty Mighty Bosstones
 Lagwagon
 The Bouncing Souls
 The Ataris
 Skunk Anansie
 Boy Azooga

Acts established or associated with the Newport music scene

Groups
 High Contrast (studied in Newport)
 Goldie Lookin Chain
 Manic Street Preachers (recorded in Newport)
 The Darling Buds
 Feeder
 60 Ft. Dolls
 Dub War
 Skindred
 Desecration
 Raindancer
 Terris
 The Vandals
 Chain of Flowers
 Novocaine
 Flyscreen
 Cowboy Killers
 Pizzatramp
 XY&O / Skip Curtis
 Jump the Underground 

Solo artists
 Joe Talbot of Idles
Donna Matthews of Elastica
 Grant Nicholas (singer)
 Nigel Pulsford of Bush
 Nick Evans (trombonist)
 Mai Jones
 Holly Holyoake (classical singer)
 Jon Langford (musician)
 Jon Lee (drummer)
 Jon Lilygreen (singer)
 Maggot (rapper)
 Mink-C (rapper)

Festivals 
 Tredegar House Folk Festival
 Colour Clash
 Let's Rock Wales
 Portstock
 Green Man Festival (in the nearby Brecon Beacons)
 Caerleon Arts Festival

Radio stations 
 Newport City Radio
 Gwent Radio
 Energize Media CIC

Venues 
Indie venues
 Le Pub
 El Sieco's (new TJ's)
 McCann's Rock 'n' Ale Bar

Former
 TJ's (former)
 Stow Hill Labour Club

Arts
 Riverfront Arts Centre

Auditoriums
 Newport Centre
 Newport Market
 NEON

Pubs and bars
 Ye Olde Murenger House
 The Hanbury Arms
 The Carpenters Arms
 The Pod
 Tiny Rebel
 Pen & Wig
 The Potters
 The Dodger
 Riverside Tavern
 Bar Amber (Ivy Bush)
 Slipping Jimmy's

Nightclubs
 Atlantica Bar & Club
 The Courtyard
 Breeze

Chain venues
 Hogarths Newport
 The John Wallace Linton
 The Tom Toya Lewis
 The Queen's Hotel

Recording studios 
 One Louder Studios, Albany Street
 Le Mons, Albany Trading Estate 
 Record One, St Vincent Street
 Kane Audio
 Ty Du Recording Studio
 Pentastar Studios

Record labels 
Current
 Junta Records
 Country Mile Records
 Diverse Records
 Madcap Records
 Kriminal Records

Former
 Cheap Sweaty Fun
 Words Of Warning Records
 Rockaway Records

See also 
 Newport, Wales
 TJ's
 Le Pub
 El Sieco's
 Riverfront Arts Centre
 Diverse Vinyl
 Toilet circuit
 Music of Cardiff
 Culture and recreation in Cardiff
 List of cultural venues in Cardiff
 Culture of Wales
 Music of Wales

References

External links 
 What's on in Newport
 Le Pub

Music venues in Newport, Wales
Newport, Wales
Music scenes
Cool Cymru
Culture in Newport, Wales
Welsh music history
Welsh music
Welsh music industry
British music